Kochiura aulica is a species of spiders in the family Theridiidae. It is found on the Canary Islands, Cape Verde Islands to Azerbaijan.

References

External links 
 Kochiura aulica at the World Spider Catalog

Theridiidae
Spiders described in 1838
Spiders of Asia